Harriet Elizabeth Walston Crawford (born 1937) is a British archaeologist. She is Reader Emerita at the UCL Institute of Archaeology and a senior fellow at the McDonald Institute for Archaeological Research, University of Cambridge.

Life
Harriet Crawford Browne was born in 1937, the elder daughter of the judge Sir Patrick Browne and Evelyn Sophie Alexandra Walston.

In 1983 she married the mathematician Peter Swinnerton-Dyer.

Ruth Whitehouse, the Institute of Archaeology's first woman professor, has commented that Crawford "definitely should have been" made professor there. After Crawford's retirement, the UCL Institute of Archaeology gave her the title of Reader Emerita, and more recently she has also been an Honorary Visiting Professor at the Institute.

Works
 The architecture of Iraq in the third millennium B.C.. Copenhagen: Akademisk Forlag, 1977
 (ed. 1979) Subterranean Britain: aspects of underground archaeology. New York: St. Martin's Press, 1979.
 Sumer and the Sumerians. Cambridge; New York: Cambridge University Press, 1991.
 (ed. with Robert Killick and Jane Moon) The Dilmun Temple at Saar : Bahrain and its archaeological inheritance. London; New York: Kegan Paul International, 1997.
 Dilmun and its Gulf neighbours. Cambridge; New York: Cambridge University Press, 1998.
 Regime change in the ancient Near East and Egypt : from Sargon of Agade to Saddam Hussein. Oxford; New York: Oxford University Press for the British Academy, 2007. Proceedings of the British Academy, 136. 
 (ed. with Augusta McMahon) Preludes to urbanism : the late Chalcolithic of Mesopotamia. Cambridge: McDonald Institute for Archaeological Research, 2014. In honour of Joan Oates.
 The Sumerian World. London; New York: Routledge, 2013.
Ur: city of the moon god. London: Bloomsbury Academic, 2015.

References

1937 births
Living people
British archaeologists
People associated with the UCL Institute of Archaeology
Women archaeologists
Wives of baronets